Charles Edward Fairman (28 December 1856 – 27 December 1934) was an American physician who published in the field of mycology. He was for many years the health officer of Yates, New York, and on the staff of the Medina (New York) Memorial Hospital. A charter member of the Mycological Society of America, Fairman published several papers relating to fungi including the pyrenomycetes, the Lophiostomataceae, and the fungi imperfecti.

Early life

Fairman was born on 28 December 1856 to parents Prof. and Mrs. Charles E. Fairman in Yates, New York, both of whom were teachers. He entered the senior class of the University of Rochester at the age of 16, and was at the time the youngest graduate the university produced. He graduated from that institution in 1873 with an A.M. degree and received his M.D. degree when he graduated from Shurtleff College in Alton, Illinois, in 1877. On 5 February 1878, he married Lois Warren, who died on 23 August 1912.

Fairman had returned to Lyndonville to practice medicine before his 21st birthday. He was a member of several medical societies and wrote for a number of medical periodicals. The fraternity journal Delta Upsilon Quarterly, in their 1890 alumni report, reports him as being employed as the Examining Surgeon for the United States Pension Department in Medina, New York. In July 1927, the New Orleans Medical Association gave him a testimonial dinner in celebration of his 50th year in the practice of medicine.

Fairman achieved worldwide renown as a mycologist. He began studying the fungi at about age 30, when his interest was piqued when he and his father-in-law (Dr. John D. Warren) undertook to cultivate mushrooms. He corresponded with various noted authorities in mycology, including Job Bicknell Ellis, Charles Horton Peck, Pier Andrea Saccardo, Heinrich Rehm, and Joseph Charles Arthur. Fairman accumulated a large personal collection of mycological books, as well as a personal herbarium of 23,000 various fungi, some of which has been incorporated in the Plant Pathology Herbarium at Cornell University. Fairman also collected specimens for the New York Botanical Garden Herbarium. Fairman was also noted as an authority on many plants.

Career

He spent the majority of his life in Lyndonville, New York, where he was one of the "best known and beloved physicians". He specialized in pyrenomycetous fungi, and mycologist Curtis Gates Lloyd once wrote "Dr. Fairman has probably the best critical knowledge of this difficult group of any one in our country." Fairman died suddenly of a heart attack on 27 December 1934, a day before he was to be honored for his 78th birthday. He is buried in Lynhaven cemetery in Lyndonville.

Taxa described

Fairman's taxonomical contributions were mostly related to pyrenomycetes and the fungi imperfecti. In his later years he specialized in the Lophiostomataceae. Taxa described by Fairman include:

Amblyosporiopsis Fairm. 1922
Amblyosporiopsis parasphenoides Fairm. 1922
Amphisphaeria abietina Fairm. 1906
Amphisphaeria aeruginosa Fairm. 1906
Amphisphaeria bertiana Fairm. 1906
Amphisphaeria nucidoma Fairm. 1921
Amphisphaeria polymorpha Fairm. 1906
Amphisphaeria vestigialis Fairm. 1910
Amphisphaeria xera Fairm. 1910
Anthostomella endoxyloides Fairm. 1922
Apiosporella cornina Fairm. 1918
Aplosporella calycanthi Fairm. 1910
Ascochyta agropyrina Fairm. 1931
Ascochyta boutelouae Fairm. 1918
Ascochyta phlogina Fairm. 1910
Ascochyta phlogis var. phlogina Fairm. 1910
Ascochyta symphoricarpophila Fairm. 1910
Ascochytula agropyrina Fairm. 1918
Camarosporium elaeagnellum Fairm. 1910
Camarosporium eriocryptum Fairm. 1923
Camarosporium estrelti Fairm. 1918
Camarosporium wistarianum Fairm. 1918
Camarosporium yuccaesedum Fairm. 1918
Caryospora cariosa Fairm. 1905
Chorostate ailanthi var. megaceraphora Fairm. 1906
Cladosporium punctulatum var. xylogenum Fairm. 1922
Cladosporium vincae Fairm. 1911
Clasterosporium larviforme Fairm. 1922
Coniosporium nucifoedum Fairm. 1921
Coniothyrium chionanthi Fairm. 1913
Coniothyrium leprosum Fairm. 1923
Coniothyrium marrubii Fairm. 1923
Coniothyrium olivaceum var. salsolae Fairm. 1918
Coniothyrium olivaceum var. thermopsidis Fairm. 1918
Coniothyrium praeclarum Fairm. 1922
Coniothyrium sepium Fairm. 1918
Cryptodiscus araneocinctus Fairm. 1913
Cryptostictis utensis Fairm. 1918
Cucurbitaria rimulina Fairm. 1922
Cylindrium gossypinum Fairm. 1921
Cylindrocolla faecalis Fairm. 1920
Cytospora nyssae Fairm. 1922
Dendrophoma nigrescens Fairm. 1922
Diaporthe ailanthi var. megacera Fairm. 1906
Diaporthe elaeagni var. americana Fairm.
Diaporthe hamamelidis Fairm. 1922
Diatrype standleyi Fairm. 1918
Dicaeoma nemoseridis Fairm. 1923
Dictyochora gambellii Fairm. 1918
Didymaria arthoniaespora Fairm. 1906
Didymella eurotiae Fairm. 1918
Didymella nucis-hicoriae Fairm. 1921
Didymella ramonae Fairm. 1923
Didymochaeta columbiana Fairm. 1922
Didymosphaeria lonicerae-ripariae Fairm. 1922
Didymosphaeria nuciseda Fairm. 1921
Didymosporium propolidioides Fairm. 1922
Diplodia akebiae Fairm. 1913
Diplodia hamamelidis Fairm. 1910
Diplodia heteromelina Fairm. 1923
Diplodina epicarya Fairm. 1921
Discella zythiacea Fairm. 1922
Discosia poikilomera Fairm. 1923
Dothiorella nucis Fairm. 1921
Dothiorella phomopsis Fairm. 1918
Eutypella brunaudiana var. ribis-aurei Fairm. 1918
Eutypella ceranata Fairm. 1923
Eutypella domicalis Fairm. 1923
Excipula dictamni Fairm. 1910
Exosporium scolecomorphum Fairm. 1922
Gamonaemella Fairm. 1922
Gamonaemella divergens Fairm. 1922
Gibberidea arthrophyma Fairm. 1918
Gloniopsis lathami Fairm. 1922
Gloniopsis lathami var. asymetrica Fairm. 1922
Glonium vestigiale Fairm. 1923
Graphium sordidiceps Fairm. 1922
Helotium vitellinum var. pallidostriatum Fairm. 1904
Hendersonia arundinariae Fairm. 1922
Hendersonia coccolobina Fairm. 1913
Hendersonia eriogoni Fairm. 1918
Hendersonia foliorum-hamamelidina Fairm. 1922
Hendersonia hortilecta Fairm. 1918
Hendersonia hydrangeae Fairm. 1910
Hendersonia hypocarpa Fairm. 1913
Hendersonia leucelenes Fairm. 1918
Hendersonia petalostemonis Fairm. 1918
Hendersonia stanleyellae Fairm. 1918
Hendersonia subcultriformis Fairm. 1918
Heteropatella acerina Fairm. 1922
Hypoderma ptarmicola Fairm. 1906
Hysterium standleyanum Fairm. 1918
Karschia crassa Fairm. 1904
Karschia elaeospora Fairm. 1921
Lasiosphaeria ovina var. aureliana Fairm. 1904
Leptosphaeria cacuminispora Fairm. 1921
Leptosphaeria coleosanthi Fairm. 1918
Leptosphaeria eustoma f. leguminosa Fairm. 1906
Leptosphaeria exocarpogena Fairm. 1921
Leptosphaeria galiorum var. gnaphaliana Fairm. 1923
Leptosphaeria hamamelidis Fairm. 1922
Leptosphaeria lyciophila Fairm. 1922
Leptosphaeria lyndonvillae Fairm. 1906
Leptosphaeria nigricans var. grindeliae Fairm. 1918
Leptosphaeria physostegiae Fairm. 1906
Leptosphaeria pseudohleria Fairm. 1922
Leptosphaeria quamoclidii Fairm. 1918
Leptospora stictochaetophora Fairm. 1906
Leptostroma mitchellae Fairm. 1922
Lophiostoma cephalanthi Fairm. 1904
Lophiostoma triseptatum var. acutum Fairm.
Lophiostoma triseptatum var. diagonale Fairm.
Lophiostoma triseptatum var. pluriseptatum Fairm.
Lophiotrema halesiae Fairm. 1910
Macrophoma fitzpatriciana Fairm. 1921
Melanomma nigriseda Fairm. 1922
Melanopsamma amphisphaeria var. carpigena Fairm. 1921
Melanopsamma subrhombispora Fairm. 1921
Merulius leguminosus Fairm. 1906
Merulius lyndonvillae Fairm. 1906
Metasphaeria leguminosa Fairm. 1906
Metasphaeria lyndonvillae Fairm. 1906
Microdiplodia anograe Fairm. 1918
Microdiplodia diervillae Fairm. 1918
Microdiplodia galiicola Fairm. 1918
Microdiplodia ilicigena Fairm. 1922
Microdiplodia leucelenes Fairm. 1918
Microdiplodia mimuli Fairm. 1923
Microdiplodia ramonae Fairm. 1923
Microdiplodia valvuli Fairm. 1910
Mollisia lanaria Fairm. 1911
Monosporium avellaneum Fairm. 1921
Mucor taeniae Fairm. 1890
Mycosphaerella chlorogali Fairm. 1923
Mycosphaerella nemoseridis Fairm. 1923
Mycosphaerella weigelae Fairm. 1910
Myriangium catalinae Fairm. 1923
Oospora sceliscophorus Fairm. 1906
Ophiobolus gnaphalii var. lanaria Fairm. 1911
Ophiobolus sceliscophorus Fairm. 1906
Patellea oreophila Fairm. 1918
Pestalotia nuciseda Fairm. 1921
Pestalotia truncata var. septoriana Fairm. 1913
Phialea phaeoconia Fairm. 1911
Phialea vitellina var. pallidostriata Fairm.
Phoma albovestita Fairm.
Phoma cercidicola Fairm. 1911
Phoma dioscoreae Fairm. 1922
Phoma estrelti Fairm. 1918
Phoma lanuginis Fairm. 1910
Phoma lyndonvillensis Fairm. 1890
Phoma megarrhizae Fairm. 1923
Phoma regina Fairm. 1911
Phoma rudbeckiae Fairm. 1890
Phoma sidalceae Fairm. 1918
Phoma verbascicarpa Fairm. 1918
Phoma weldiana Fairm.
Phomopsis carposchiza Fairm. 1921
Phomopsis ericaceana Fairm. 1918
Phomopsis fraterna Fairm. 1922
Phomopsis nicotianae Fairm. 1923
Phomopsis rubiseda Fairm. 1922
Phomopsis trillii Fairm. 1922
Phyllachora blepharoneuri Fairm. 1918
Phyllachora nuttalliana Fairm. 1923
Phyllosticta dictamni Fairm. 1910
Phyllosticta kalmicola var. berolinensiformis Fairm. 1910
Phyllosticta mortonii Fairm. 1913
Phyllosticta pitcheriana Fairm. 1910
Phyllosticta rhoiseda Fairm. 1923
Physalospora eucalyptina Fairm. 1923
Physalospora heteromelina Fairm. 1923
Platystomum phyllogenum Fairm. 1918
Pleospora aureliana Fairm. 1906
Pleospora chlorogali Fairm. 1923
Pyrenochaeta fraxinina Fairm. 1913
Pyrenochaeta nucinata Fairm. 1921
Pyrenopeziza cephalanthi Fairm. 1904
Pyrenophora leucelenes Fairm. 1918
Rhabdospora baculum var. nucimaculans Fairm. 1921
Rhabdospora cryphosporopsis Fairm. 1922
Rhabdospora dumentorum Fairm. 1918
Rhabdospora dumetorum Fairm. 1918
Rhabdospora gauracea Fairm. 1918
Rhabdospora ilicigena Fairm. 1922
Rhabdospora translucens Fairm. 1918
Rhynchosphaeria nucicola Fairm. 1921
Rhynchostoma nucis Fairm. 1921
Schizocapnodium Fairm. 1921
Schizocapnodium sarcinellum Fairm. 1921
Scolicosporium transversum Fairm. 1922
Septocylindrium nuculinum Fairm. 1921
Septoria carricerae Fairm. 1913
Septoria lanaria Fairm. 1911
Sphaerographium avenaceum Fairm. 1923
Sphaeronaema epicaulon Fairm. 1922
Sphaeropsis coccolobae Fairm. 1913
Sphaeropsis diervillae Fairm.
Sphaeropsis elaeagnina Fairm. 1910
Sphaeropsis nebelina Fairm. 1923
Sphaeropsis opuntiae Fairm. 1922
Sphaeropsis pallidula Fairm. 1921
Sphaeropsis rhodocarpa Fairm. 1913
Sphaeropsis subconfluens Fairm. 1922
Sphaeropsis wistariana Fairm. 1918
Sporidesmium leguminosa Fairm. 1906
Sporormia leguminosa Fairm. 1906
Sporormia ourasca Fairm. 1922
Stagonospora humuli-americani Fairm. 1918
Stagonospora nucicidia Fairm. 1921
Stagonospora nuciseda Fairm. 1921
Stagonospora nyssicola Fairm. 1922
Stemphylium subsphaericum Fairm. 1922
Stictis lanuginicincta Fairm. 1923
Strickeria catalinae Fairm. 1923
Tapesia rhois Fairm. 1900
Tapesia secamenti Fairm. 1910
Teichosporella lonicerina Fairm. 1923
Trichopeziza interpilosa Fairm. 1906
Trichosphaeria interpilosa Fairm.
Valsa holodiscina Fairm. 1923
Valsaria acericola Fairm. 1905
Vermicularia exocarpinella Fairm. 1921
Vermicularia phlogina Fairm. 1887
Vermicularia putaminicrustans Fairm. 1921
Vermicularia solanoica Fairm.
Volutella caryogena Fairm. 1921
Volutella vincae Fairm. 1911
Zignoëlla nucivora Fairm. 1921

Publications 

 Fairman, C.E. (1887). "A method of staining Peziza specimens". Botanical Gazette 12(4): 85. 
 ___ (1887). "Ash in basket work". Botanical Gazette. 12(3): 64–65. 
 ___ (1887). "Vermicularia phlogina Fairm. n. sp.". Botanical Gazette 12(3): 67. 
 ___ (1889). "Black spot of asparagus berries". Journal of Mycology 5(3): 157–158. 
 ___ (1889). "Notes on rare fungi from western New York". Journal of Mycology 5(2): 78–80. 
 ___ (1890). "Observation on the development of some fenestrate sporidia". Journal of Mycology 6(1): 29–31. 
 ___ (1890). "The fungi of western New York". Proceedings of the Rochester Academy of Sciences 2: 154–167.
 ___ (1900). "Puff-balls, slime moulds and cup fungi of Orleans County, New York". Proceedings of the Rochester Academy of Sciences 3: 206–220.
 ___ (1904). "Some new fungi from western New York". Journal of Mycology 10(5): 229–231. 
 ___ (1905). "The Pyrenomyceteae or Orleans County, New York". Proceedings of the Rochester Academy of Sciences 4: 165–191.
 ___ (1906). "Pyrenomycetaceae novae in leguminibus Robiniae". Annales Mycologici 4:326–328.
 ___ (1906). "New or rare Pyrenomycetaceae from western New York". Proceedings of the Rochester Academy of Sciences 4: 215–224, pl.20–22.
 ___, Bonansea S, Saccardo PA. (1906). "Micromycetes Americani Novi". The Journal of Mycology 12(2): 47–52. 
 ___ (1910). "Fungi Lyndonvillenses novi vel minus cogniti". Annales Mycologici 8 (3): 322–332.
 ___ (1910, publ. 1911). "Fungi Lyndonvillenses novi vel minus cogniti. Series II". Annales Mycologici 9: 147–152, 7 figs.
 ___ (1913). "Notes on new species of fungi from various localities". Mycologia 5(4): 245–248. 
 ___ (1918). "Notes on new species of fungi from various localities – II". Mycologia 10(3): 164–167. 
 ___ (1918). "New or noteworthy ascomycetes and lower fungi from New Mexico. Mycologia 10(5): 239–264. 
 ___ (1921). "The fungi of our common nuts and pits". Proceedings of the Rochester Academy of Sciences 6: 73–115, tabs 15–20.
 ___ (1922). "New or rare fungi from various localities". Proceedings of the Rochester Academy of Sciences 6: 117–139.

References

American mycologists
1856 births
1934 deaths
People from Yates, New York
Scientists from New York (state)